Blacktown District Cricket Club is a cricket club in Blacktown, New South Wales, Australia. They are also known as the Blacktown Warriors and play in the Sydney Grade Cricket competition. They were founded in 1894.

See also

References

External links
 

Sydney Grade Cricket clubs
Cricket clubs established in 1894
1894 establishments in Australia
Indigenous Australian sport
Blacktown